Schmucker or Schmücker is a German language surname. Notable people with the name include:
 Beale M. Schmucker (1827–1888), American Lutheran leader, liturgical scholar and historian
 František Schmucker (1940–2004), Czech football player
 John George Schmucker (1771–1854), German-American Lutheran clergyman
 Kurt Schmücker (1919–1996), German politician
 Peter Schmucker (1784–1860), American Methodist minister
 Samuel D. Schmucker (1844–1911), American jurist
 Samuel Mosheim Schmucker (1823–1863), American historical writer
 Samuel Simon Schmucker (1799–1873), German-American Lutheran pastor and theologian

German-language surnames
Occupational surnames